The 1994–95 Manhattan Jaspers basketball team represented Manhattan College during the 1994–95 NCAA Division I men's basketball season. The Jaspers, led by third-year head coach Fran Fraschilla, played their home games at Draddy Gymnasium and were members of the Metro Atlantic Athletic Conference. They finished the season 26–5, 12–2 in MAAC play to finish in first place. They lost the championship game of the MAAC tournament, but secured an at-large bid to the NCAA tournament. Playing as the No. 13 seed in the Southeast region, the Jaspers upset No. 4 seed Oklahoma in the opening round. Manhattan was beaten by No. 5 seed Arizona State in the round of 32.

Roster

Schedule and results

|-
!colspan=9 style=";"| Non-Conference Regular season

|-
!colspan=9 style=";"| MAAC Regular season

|-
!colspan=9 style=";"| MAAC tournament

|-
!colspan=9 style=";"| NCAA tournament

References

Manhattan Jaspers basketball seasons
Manhattan
Manhattan
Manhattan Jaspers men's basketball
Manhattan Jaspers men's basketball